Donald Lee Buschhorn (born April 29, 1946) is a retired American Major League Baseball pitcher. He played for the Kansas City Athletics during the  season.

Buschhorn spent the entire 1965 campaign — his second as a professional — on the Athletics' roster per the bonus rules of the mid-1960s. His first three appearances of that season were as a starting pitcher, and in his debut game against the eventual American League champion Minnesota Twins, Buschhorn struck out the first two big-league batters he faced: Zoilo Versalles and Rich Rollins. Versalles would be the AL Most Valuable Player for 1965. The Twins eventually reached Buschhorn for two runs, including one on a home run by Jerry Kindall, and Buschhorn was tagged with the 2–0 loss, his only MLB decision.

In 31 innings for the Athletics that season, Buschhorn yielded 36 hits and eight bases on balls, striking out nine. His professional career continued in 1966 and 1968–1969.

References

1946 births
Living people
Baseball players from Missouri
Kansas City Athletics players
Major League Baseball pitchers
Sportspeople from Independence, Missouri
Wytheville A's players
Burlington Bees players
Modesto Reds players
Birmingham A's players